Brett Jordan Dier (born February 14, 1990) is a Canadian actor. He is best known for his role as Michael Cordero Jr. on Jane the Virgin. He is also known for his recurring roles on the Canadian TV shows Bomb Girls and The L.A. Complex, and most recently for his main role as "C.B." on the ABC sitcom Schooled.

Early life
Dier was born on February 14, 1990, in London, Ontario and went to London South Collegiate Institute. He grew up with an older sister and younger brother. He studied improv as well as receiving his first dan black belt in Taekwondo. He reached the 6th grade of Conservatory Music in piano, including the Suzuki method since the age of 4. He also plays the guitar. Dier received honours for his work. He also breakdances and practices swimming and bouldering.

Career
Dier received his debut role in the TV movie Family in Hiding as Matt Peterson in 2006. In 2007, he appeared in Seventeen and Missing and The Secrets of Comforting House. In 2008, he gained the role of Caden in Every Second Counts and an alternate Clark Kent in Smallville. He appeared in a small role as Derek Edlund in Fear Itself.

In 2010, he had a cameo appearance in Diary of a Wimpy Kid as a breakdancer. He made appearances in Made: The Movie and Meteor Storm. He had a recurring role in Mr. Young as Hutch. He was in another TV movie, Mega Cyclone, as Will Newamr. In 2012, he had a role in Space Twister. In another recurring role, he was Brandon Kelly in The L.A. Complex. He also had a guest starring role in an episode of the television show Blackstone.

In 2013, he played a lead role on Ravenswood as Luke Matheson. The series was cancelled after one season.

He received critical acclaim for his role in Bomb Girls as Gene Corbett. He appeared in Exeter which was released in 2015. From 2014 to 2019, he played the role of Detective Michael Cordero Jr. in Jane the Virgin.

On October 3, 2018, it was announced by Deadline that Dier would have a series regular role on the ABC situation comedy Schooled as C.B., a teacher who is both a friend and rival to rookie teacher Lainey Lewis who is also based on series co-creator Adam F. Goldberg’s favourite teacher and friend.

Filmography

References

External links

1990 births
21st-century Canadian male actors
Canadian male child actors
Canadian male film actors
Canadian male taekwondo practitioners
Canadian male television actors
Living people
Male actors from London, Ontario